Bus Stop is an Indian Marathi language film directed by Sameer Hemant Joshi. The film stars Amruta Khanvilkar , Aniket Vishwasrao , Hemant Dhome , Siddharth Chandekar , Pooja Sawant and 
Rasika Sunil Music by Saurabh, Jasraj and Hrushikesh. The film was released on 21 July 2017.

Synopsis 
The lives of a group of students, their friendships, relationships, and everyday issues. The friends are all from different backgrounds and want different things in life but each has a complicated relationship with their parents.

Cast 
 Amruta Khanvilkar as Sharyu 
 Aniket Vishwasrao as Deven
 Hemant Dhome as Keshav 
 Siddharth Chandekar as Vineet
 Pooja Sawant as Anushka 
 Suyog Gore as Sumedh 
 Rasika Sunil as Maithili 
 Akshay Waghmare as Abhishek 
 Madhura Deshpande as Radhika 
 Avinash Narkar
 Sanjay Mone
 Sharad Ponkshe
 Uday Tikekar
 Vidyadhar 
 Seema Chandekar
'Manjusha Godse
 Adhashree Atre

Soundtrack

Critical reception 
Bus Stop film received negative reviews from critics. Ganesh Matkari of Pune Mirror says "There is some attempt to address the generation gap issue (nothing new there as well), but that comes much later in the film, and with little or no consistency. Apparently, the film’s title is a metaphor, but it remains unexplained. Although it did remind me of all the places buses could take me to if I could get up and leave". Keyur Seta of Cinestaan.com Wrote "Overall, you would be well advised to skip this Bus Stop". Swati vemul of Loksatta wrote" Overall, 'Bus Stop' feels lost due to the misalignment of the story, clumsiness, a few drawn-out shots and an incomplete ending". Ibrahim Afghan of Maharashtra Times wrote "The absurdity of this film makes you laugh out loud. So how can you say that this film does not entertain?". Raj Chinchankar of Lokmat wrote "If there are not many expectations, it can be given up at once; But despite the best team of artists in the Marathi film industry, nothing is coming out of this film, but the great sadness of the disappointment caused by this film is painful".

References

External links
 
 

2017 films
2010s Marathi-language films
Indian drama films